F.W. Scheper Store is a historic general store located at Port Royal, Beaufort County, South Carolina.   The store is one of the last remaining 19th century commercial buildings in Port Royal. It was built in 1885, and is a large two-story frame commercial building, with a one-story addition constructed between 1905 and 1912.  It is the largest historic commercial building remaining in Port Royal. The store served the community from its construction by German immigrant F.W. Scheper until it closed for business in 1950.

It was listed in the National Register of Historic Places in 2004.

References

Commercial buildings on the National Register of Historic Places in South Carolina
Commercial buildings completed in 1885
Buildings and structures in Beaufort County, South Carolina
National Register of Historic Places in Beaufort County, South Carolina